Jining Medical University (is a public institution of higher learning in Jining and Rizhao, Shandong province, China. Most departments offer courses in different Medical sciences.

External links
Official website

Universities and colleges in Shandong
Jining
Rizhao